Clemente Sibiliato or Sibilato (10 February 1719 - 14 February 1795) was an Italian cleric, poet, and librarian.

He was born in Bovolenta, near Padua. In a seminary of Padua, her entered religious order, and became a professor at the young age of 25 years. By 1759, he was named professor of Latin and Greek at the University of Padua. He often wrote poems dedicated to patrons and occasions. He became a member of the  Accademia dei Ricovrati and the Reale Accademia di scienze e belle lettere of Mantua.

In 1792, he published the biography of the mathematician Giuseppe Torelli (1721 – 1781). Among his other works are:
Oratio in funere Benedicti XIV (1738)
De Eloquenti marci Foscarini Venetorm ducis
Dissertazione sopra il quesito: Se la poesia influisea nel bene dello stato, e comepssa essere l'oggetto dell politica.
Memoria dopra lo spirto filosofico delle belle lettere
Lettere del Conte Algarotti e dell'Abate Sibiliato sopra la spiegazione di due passi di Virgilio nel libro II della Georgica
Saggio di discorsi per ciascun giorno della quaresima del signor abate di Breteville
Principi di religione, ossi Preservativo contro l'incredulita

Bibliography 
Galtarossa Massimo, Dizionario Biografico degli Italiani, edited by Treccani.

References

1719 births
1795 deaths
18th-century Italian writers
Italian librarians
18th-century Italian male writers
People from Padua